The Oriental Building Association No. 6 Building is a historic building, located at 600 F Street, Northwest Washington, D.C. in the Penn Quarter neighborhood.

History
It was designed by Albert Goehner, in the Italian Renaissance Revival style.

It was the headquarters of the Oriental Building Association founded by German immigrants in 1861.
It is the oldest savings and loan association in the United States.

It is currently the home of a Fuel Pizza franchise.

See also
 National Register of Historic Places listings in central Washington, D.C.

References

External links
 
https://www.flickr.com/photos/mvjantzen/4140004348/

Commercial buildings completed in 1909
Commercial buildings on the National Register of Historic Places in Washington, D.C.
Neoclassical architecture in Washington, D.C.